Giovanna Ralli,  (born 3 January 1935), is an Italian stage, film and television actress.

Life and career 
Born in Rome, Ralli debuted as a child actress at 7; at 13 she made her theatrical debut, entering the stage company of Peppino De Filippo. After appearing in Federico Fellini and Alberto Lattuada's Variety Lights (1950), Ralli had her first film roles of weight in mid-fifties, often in comedy films. In 1959 she had a leading role in Roberto Rossellini's General Della Rovere, that won the Golden Lion at the Venice Film Festival, while in 1960 her performance in Escape by Night, still directed by Rossellini, was awarded with the Golden Gate Award for Best Actress at the San Francisco International Film Festival. 

Ralli later won a Nastro d'Argento award, as best actress, for La fuga (1964). In the mid-sixties she had a brief Hollywood career, starting from Blake Edwards' What Did You Do in the War, Daddy?. In 1974 she won her second Nastro d'Argento, as best supporting actress, for We All Loved Each Other So Much. Starting from early eighties, Ralli focused her activities on stage. In 1993 she received a Flaiano Prize for her career. In 2003 she was made a Grand Officer of the Italian Republic. At the 2015 Taormina Film Fest, where she received a special award for her career, Ralli announced her retirement from acting. She considers herself Roman Catholic.

Filmography 

 The Children Are Watching Us (1942, by Vittorio De Sica) – Una bambina
 The Passaguai Family by Aldo Fabrizi (1950)
 Variety Lights by Alberto Lattuada and Federico Fellini (1950)
 The Passaguai Family Gets Rich by Aldo Fabrizi (1952)
 La lupa by Alberto Lattuada (1953)
 Rivalry by Giuliano Biagetti (1953)
 It Happened in the Park by Gianni Franciolini (1953)
 Easy Years by Luigi Zampa (1953)
 The Ship of Condemned Women by Raffaello Matarazzo (1953)
 Le signorine dello 04 by Gianni Franciolini (1954)
 Madame du Barry by Christian-Jacque (1954)
 The Three Thieves by Lionello De Felice (1954)
 Roman Tales by Gianni Franciolini (1955)
 Le ragazze di San Frediano by Valerio Zurlini (1955)
 Les Hussards by Alex Joffé (1955)
 A Hero of Our Times by Mario Monicelli (1955)
 The Bigamist by Luciano Emmer (1956)
 Peccato di castità by Gianni Franciolini (1956)
 The Most Wonderful Moment by Luciano Emmer (1957)
 Nel blu dipinto di blu by Piero Tellini (1959)
 Move and I'll Shoot by Mario Mattoli (1958)
 The Defeated Victor by Paolo Heusch (1958)
 Tuppe tuppe, Marescià! by Carlo Ludovico Bragaglia (1958)
 My Wife's Enemy by Gianni Puccini (1959)
 The Thieves by Lucio Fulci (1959)
 General Della Rovere by Roberto Rossellini (1959)
 Wild Cats on the Beach by Vittorio Sala (1959)
 Escape by Night by Roberto Rossellini (1960)
 Warriors Five by Leopoldo Savona (1960)
 Carmen di Trastevere by Carmine Gallone (1962)
 La monaca di Monza by Carmine Gallone (1962)
 Let's Talk About Women by Ettore Scola (1964)
 La vita agra by Carlo Lizzani (1964)
 La fuga by Paolo Spinola (1964)
 What Did You Do in the War, Daddy?  by Blake Edwards (1966)
 The Caper of the Golden Bulls by Russell Rouse (1967)
 The Mercenary by Sergio Corbucci (1968)
 Deadfall  by Bryan Forbes (1968)
 The Invisible Woman (1969, by Paolo Spinola) – Laura
 Cannon for Cordoba (1970, by Paul Wendkos) – Leonora
 Una prostituta al servizio del pubblico e in regola con le leggi dello stato (1971, by Italo Zingarelli) – Oslavia
 Cold Eyes of Fear (1971, by Enzo G. Castellari) – Anna
 What Have They Done to Your Daughters? (1974, by Massimo Dallamano) – Asst. DA Vittoria Stori
 We All Loved Each Other So Much (1974, by Ettore Scola) – Elide Catenacci
 To Love Ophelia (1974, by Flavio Mogherini) – Ofelia Ceciaretti
 Di che segno sei? (1975, by Sergio Corbucci) – Cristina, Leonardo lover
 Sex with a Smile (1976, by Sergio Martino) – Esmeralda (segment "L'attimo fuggente")
 Chi dice donna dice donna (1976, by Tonino Cervi) – La signorina X (segment "La signorina X")
 Colpita da improvviso benessere (1976, by Franco Giraldi) – Elisabetta
 Languid Kisses, Wet Caresses (1976, by Alfredo Angeli) – Elena
 Con il dovuto rispetto (1976)
 Arrivano i bersaglieri (1980, by Luigi Magni) – Nunziatina
 Manolesta (1981, by Pasquale Festa Campanile) – Anna
 Towards Evening (1990, by Francesca Archibugi) – Pina
 Per non-dimenticare (1992, by Massimo Martelli)
 Once a Year, Every Year (1994, by Gianfrancesco Lazotti) – Laura
 Sunday Lunch (2003, by Carlo Vanzina) – Franca Malorni
 Blood of the Losers (2008, by Michele Soavi) – Giulia Dogliani
 The Immature (2011, by Paolo Genovese) – Iole, Lorenzo's mother
 The Immature: The Trip (2012, by Paolo Genovese) – Iole, Lorenzo's mother
 A Golden Boy (2014, by Pupi Avati) – Madre di Davide

References

External links 

 Archivio Rai Uno
 

1935 births
Living people
20th-century Italian actresses
21st-century Italian actresses
Actresses from Rome
Grand Officers of the Order of Merit of the Italian Republic
Italian child actresses
Italian film actresses
Spaghetti Western actresses
Italian television actresses
Nastro d'Argento winners
People of Lazian descent
Italian Roman Catholics
Commanders of the Order of Merit of the Italian Republic